Parallel Glacier is part of the Waddington Range in the southern British Columbia Coast Mountains. It is a small alpine glacier on the north side of Umbra Ridge (51°27'05''N, 125°17'35''W). It extends to the northeast from Mount Geddes toward Pocket Valley.

References

Glaciers of the Pacific Ranges
Waddington Range